You Don't Know may refer to:

 "You Don't Know" (702 song), 1999
 "You Don't Know" (Berlin song), 1986
 "You Don't Know" (Cyndi Lauper song), 1997
 "You Don't Know" (Helen Shapiro song), 1961
 "You Don't Know" (Kierra Sheard song), 2004
 "You Don't Know" (Eminem song), featuring 50 Cent, Lloyd Banks, and Cashis, 2006
 "You Don't Know" (Smoove & Turrell song), 2009
 "You Don't Know", a song by KC and the Sunshine Band from Do It Good, 1974
 "You Don't Know", a song by Milow, 2006
 "You Don't Know", a song by Missy Elliott from Da Real World, 1999
 "You Don't Know", a song by Scarlett and Black, 1986
 "You Don't Know", a song by Westlife from World of Our Own, 2001
 "You Don't Know", a song from the musical Next to Normal, 2008
 You Don't Know, a sampler album issued by Ninja Tune, 2008

See also